Antonius Atticus was a rhetorician of ancient Rome who lived in the age of Seneca the Elder and Quintilian.

Notes

Ancient Roman rhetoricians
1st-century BC Romans
1st-century Romans
Atticus